Sollefteå GIF is a Swedish football club located in Sollefteå.

Background

The club was founded in 1898 catering for a variety of sports. From 1905 the club gradually developed its football section. In the 1953/54 season the club played in Division 2 Norrland for the first time. This achievement was repeated in 1955/56 and 1961. In 2010 the club is again playing in Division 2 Norrland but this now represents fourth tier football in the Swedish football league system.

The club is affiliated to the Ångermanlands Fotbollförbund.

Season to season

Attendances

In recent seasons Sollefteå GIF have had the following average attendances:

External links
 Sollefteå GIF – official site

Footnotes

Sport in Sollefteå
Football clubs in Västernorrland County
Sports clubs established in 1898
Association football clubs established in 1905
1898 establishments in Sweden